Manjhi, sometimes recorded as Majhwar and as Majhi, is a community in the Indian states of Madhya Pradesh and Bihar, where they are classified as a Scheduled Tribe for the purposes of India's system of positive discrimination.

Notable people
Dashrath Manjhi, also known as the Mountain Man of Bihar
Jitan Ram Manjhi, former Chief Minister of Bihar

References

Scheduled Tribes of Madhya Pradesh